In mathematics, the Skorokhod integral, often denoted , is an operator of great importance in the theory of stochastic processes.  It is named after the Ukrainian mathematician Anatoliy Skorokhod.  Part of its importance is that it unifies several concepts:
  is an extension of the Itô integral to non-adapted processes;
  is the adjoint of the Malliavin derivative, which is fundamental to the stochastic calculus of variations (Malliavin calculus);
  is an infinite-dimensional generalization of the divergence operator from classical vector calculus.

Definition

Preliminaries: the Malliavin derivative

Consider a fixed probability space  and a Hilbert space ;  denotes expectation with respect to 

Consider a family of -valued random variables , indexed by the elements  of the Hilbert space .

It can be shown that, given , there always exists a probability space  and a family of random variables with the above properties. The Malliavin derivative is essentially defined by formally setting the derivative of the random variable  to be , and then extending this definition to "smooth enough" random variables. For a random variable  of the form

where  is smooth, the Malliavin derivative is defined using the earlier "formal definition" and the chain rule:

In other words, whereas  was a real-valued random variable, its derivative  is an -valued random variable, an element of the space .

The Skorokhod integral

For simplicity, consider now just the case . The Skorokhod integral  is defined to be the -adjoint of the Malliavin derivative .

Just as the Malliavin derivative  was first defined on simple, smooth random variables, the Skorokhod integral has a simple expression for "simple processes":  if  is given by

Properties

The Skorokhod and Itô integrals coincide in that case, and the above equation becomes the Itô isometry.

 The derivative of a Skorokhod integral is given by the formula

References
 
  
 

Definitions of mathematical integration
Stochastic calculus